Alessandro Campagna (born October 10, 1991) is an Italian Welterweight kickboxer, fighting out of Pro Fighting Roma in Rome, Italy. He recently won an 8-man tournament in Paramaribo in Suriname called "Soema Na Basi" beating more experienced and quoted fighters from the Netherlands and Suriname.

Biography and career
Born in Rome, Italy, he started to train Kickboxing at the age of 10 and after a while he decided to practice Muay thai. He trained at Pro Fighting Roma followed by Alessio Smeriglio. He had his first fight at the age of 16. He has an older brother : Antonio Campagna, which fights too into the -61 Weight division and is currently K-1 Italian National Champion and is more active into the Amateur Tournaments, where he earned a Silver medal in Baku, Azerbaijan during the Wako European Amateur Championship. Alessandro is a full-time Studend and he practice as a professional fighter when he's not at school.

Campagna won against Fabio Pinca via unanimous decision in a tournament reserve bout at Glory 3: Rome - 2012 Middleweight Slam Final 8 to be held on November 3, 2012 in Rome,

After Glory World Series he changed Trainer and moved with Mr. Riccardo Lecca and Invictus team. He also is being followed on specific boxing trainer by the professional Italian boxer Mr. Marco Scafi .

He lost to Andy Riste via unanimous decision at Glory 6: Istanbul on April 6, 2013.

He lost to Jingreedtong by decision in the semi-finals of the four man tournament at MAX Muay Thai 4 in Sendai, Japan on October 6, 2013.

Campagna won against Hamza Imane via unanimous decision at Fight Clubbing: The European Edition, in Pescara, Italy on October 25, 2015,  and became the new FIGHT1 PRO ITALIAN NATIONAL CHAMPION 73 kg

Campagna lost to Enriko Gogokhia via first-round TKO at Oktagon Legend 3 in Milan, Italy on April 5, 2014, the first time he had been stopped.

Alessandro Campagna after his victory against the superstar Marco "The Sniper" Pique, decides to begin his new career as an amateur boxer ( current amateur boxer Elite 81 kg ) and then move in the future on professional boxing.

Championships and accomplishments
Italian F.I.K.B. K-1 National K1 Champion 2009
OKTAGON 2011 
Oktagon Italian selections winner 2011 with a total of 4 matches and 4 wins
Oktagon prestige fight winner 2011 
Soema Na basi 2011- 8 Man Tournament winner in Paramaribo, Suriname
WAKO Pro K-1 Rules World Welterweight Champion +66.8 kg 
Ranked N.21 from Glory World Series Professional Rankings Lightweight Division - 
Fight1 PRO Italian Champion 73 kg 2015 in Pescara, Italy

Sponsorship
Alessandro is currently sponsored by the Italian Brand LEONE1947, one of the most important fighters brand that sponsor also Top fighters like Giorgio Petrosyan, Artur Kyshenko, Gago Drago and a lot of notable fighters all over the globe.

Kickboxing record

|-  style="background:#cfc;"
| 2015-12-20 || Win ||align=left| Marco Pique || Invictus Arena, Prestige Fight|| Rome, Italy || Decision (unanimous) || 3 || 3:00
|-  style="background:#cfc;"
| 2015-12-08 || Win ||align=left| Jouad El Byari || Fight Clubbing The Reality 2.0 Muay Thai Vs Sanda|| Lecce, Italy || Decision (unanimous) || 3 || 3:00
|-  style="background:#cfc;"
| 2014-10-25 || Win ||align=left| Hamza Imane || Fight Clubbing The European Edition|| Pescara, Italy || Decision (unanimous) || 5 || 3:00
|-
! style=background:white colspan=9 |
|-  style="background:#fbb;"
| 2014-04-05 || Loss ||align=left| Enriko Gogokhia || Legend 3: Pour Homme || Milan, Italy || TKO (left hook) || 1 || 2:20
|-  style="background:#cfc;"
| 2014-03-09 || Win ||align=left| Simone Del Vecchio || All 4 Glory K-Nok|| Cento, Italy || Decision (unanimous) || 5 || 3:00
|-
|-  style="background:#fbb;"
| 2013-10-06 || Loss ||align=left| Jingreedtong || MAX Muay Thai 4, Semi Finals || Sendai, Japan || Decision || 3 || 3:00
|-  style="background:#fbb;"
| 2013-04-06 || Loss ||align=left| Andy Ristie || Glory 6: Istanbul || Istanbul, Turkey || Decision (unanimous) || 3 || 3:00
|-  style="background:#cfc;"
| 2012-12-08 || Win ||align=left| Julian Imeri || Invictus Arena, Prestige Fight|| Rome, Italy || Decision (unanimous) || 3 || 3:00
|-  style="background:#cfc;"
| 2012-12-08 || Win ||align=left| Daniel Guţă || Rome Kickboxing GP, Prestige Fight|| Rome, Italy || Decision (unanimous) || 3 || 3:00
|-  style="background:#cfc;"
| 2012-11-02 || Win ||align=left| Fabio Pinca || Glory 3: Rome - 70 kg Slam Tournament, Reserve Bout || Rome, Italy || Decision (unanimous) || 3 || 3:00
|-  style="background:#fbb;"
| 2012-05-05 || Loss ||align=left| Chingiz Allazov || La notte dei Campioni || Seregno, Italy || KO (Punch) || 1 || 
|-
|-  style="background:#cfc;"
| 2012-04-14 || Win ||align=left| Luciano "Boinha" Lopez || Italia vs Brasil, Belt Title Fight || Piraju, Brasil || TKO (punch) || 4 || 
|-
! style=background:white colspan=9 |
|-
|-  style="background:#cfc;"
| 2012-01-21 || Win ||align=left| Corrado Zanchi || Yokkao Extreme,Prestige Fight || Milan, Italy || Decision(unanimous) || 3 || 3:00
|-
|-  style="background:#cfc;"
| 2011-08-26 || Win ||align=left| Miloud El Guebli || Soema Na Basi, Final || Paramaribo, Suriname || KO (Punch) || 1 || 
|-
! style=background:white colspan=9 |
|-  style="background:#cfc;"
| 2011-08-26 || Win ||align=left| Ajay Balgobind || Soema Na Basi, Semi Finals || Paramaribo, Suriname || Decision || 3 ||  3:00
|-  style="background:#cfc;"
| 2011-08-26 || Win ||align=left| Mandela Antone || Soema Na Basi, Quarters|| Paramaribo, Suriname || Decision || 3 || 3:00
|-  style="background:#fbb;"
| 2011-04-30 || Loss ||align=left| Julian Imeri || Ring Rules || Milan, Italy || Decision || 3 || 3:00
|-  style="background:#cfc;"
| 2011-03-12 || Win ||align=left| Philippe Salmon || OKTAGON 2011 MILAN || Milan, Italy || TKO (Ref.Stoppage) || 1 ||   
|-
! style=background:white colspan=9 |
|-  style="background:#cfc;"
| 2011-02-19 || Win ||align=left| Lorenzo Mosca ||  Oktagon Final || Quartu Sant'Elena, Italy || Decision || 3 || 3:00
|-  style="background:#cfc;"
| 2011-06-02 || Win ||align=left| Filippo Gallerini || Oktagon Semi Finals || Savignano sul Rubicone, Italy || TKO (ref.Stoppage) || 3 ||
|-  style="background:#cfc;"
| 2011-22-01 || Win ||align=left| Guglielmo Carata || KnockOut Fight Night || Rome, Italy || Decision || 3 || 3:00
|-  style="background:#fbb;"
| 2010-04-12 || Loss ||align=left| Harut Grigorian || "Janus Fight Night"|| Padova, Italy  || Decision || 5 || 3:00
|-  style="background:#cfc;"
| 2010-23-10 || Win ||align=left| Nicolosi Paolo || "Rome Grand Prix" || Rome, Italy || TKO (cut)|| 2 || 
|-  style="background:#cfc;"
| 2010-09-10 || Win ||align=left| Houcine Bennoui || "Shardana K-1" || Santa Teresa Gallura, Italy || KO (Punch) || 1 ||
|-  style="background:#cfc;"
| 2010-04-10 || Win ||align=left| Fabio Di Marco || "Shardana K-1" || Olbia, Italy || TKO(knee-cut) || 1 ||
|-  style="background:#cfc;"
| 2010-20-02 || Win ||align=left| Marco Lazzaretti || "XXL Fight Tribe" || Scandicci, Italy || KO (Middle Kick) || 3 ||
|-  style="background:#cfc;"
| 2009-22-11 || Win ||align=left| Wladimiro Laghi || "Gladiatori Atto IX || Bologna, Italy || KO || 2 || 
|-
| colspan=9 | Legend:

External links
OKTAGON
SOEMA NA BASI - Surinam
Pro fighting Rome

References

1991 births
Living people
Italian male kickboxers
Welterweight kickboxers
Italian Muay Thai practitioners
Sportspeople from Rome